Carl Abraham Daniel Fehrman (3 February 1915, in Lund – 24 May 2010, in Lund) was a Swedish literary historian. He was appointed professor at the University of Lund from 1958 to 1980. Among his works is Forskning i förvandling from 1972. He was awarded the Dobloug Prize in 2006. He was a member of the Norwegian Academy of Science and Letters.

References

1915 births
2010 deaths
Swedish literary historians
Dobloug Prize winners
Members of the Norwegian Academy of Science and Letters